Leachianone-G 2''-dimethylallyltransferase (LG 2''-dimethylallyltransferase, leachianone G 2''-dimethylallyltransferase, LGDT) is an enzyme with systematic name dimethylallyl-diphosphate:leachianone-G 2''-dimethylallyltransferase. This enzyme catalyses the following chemical reaction:

 dimethylallyl diphosphate + leachianone G  diphosphate + sophoraflavanone G

This membrane-bound enzyme is located in the plastids and requires Mg2+ for activity.

References

External links 

EC 2.5.1